The Guemes Island ferry, the M/V Guemes, carries passengers and vehicles across Guemes Channel between Anacortes, Washington and Guemes Island. The ferry is operated by the Skagit County Public Works Department's Ferry Division.

History
The original mariners in these waters were the Coast Salish, who traveled in fine, hand-carved cedar canoes. Guemes Island is within the historical territory of the Samish Indian Nation. A Samish village called Sxwalímet existed on the site of what is now the Guemes Island Ferry Terminal until the first decade of the 1900s.

Scheduled ferry service between Anacortes and Guemes Island dates to 1890. According to a published timeline produced by the Anacortes Museum:

 1890-1902: W.C. Pyle established the first private ferry to Guemes Island. The earliest ferries were the Iola and the Glide.   
 1902-1911: The Sunny Jim was in service.
 1911-1917: The 35-passenger Elk was in service. 
 1917-1959: The Guemes was in service. Guemes was one of nine true ferries then in operation on Puget Sound. 
 1959-1979: The Almar was in service. Almar was built in 1947 on Puget Island in the Columbia River, where it served until moving to the Guemes ferry route. Almar, with a capacity for nine vehicles, was not a true double-ender; the ferry had to be backed into the Anacortes slip, and large trucks could not be carried. Almar is reported to still be afloat in Alaska.
 1979–present: The current Guemes went into service.

Noted ferry operators and captains on the Anacortes-Guemes Island route include Harry Rickaby, 1902–11; Bill Bessner, 1920-1948; Sandy Bernsen, 1950-1963; and Ray Separvich, 1965-1986.

Anacortes-Guemes ferry route

Guemes Island is accessible only by water, and the Skagit County-operated ferry is a vital transportation link between Anacortes (Fidalgo Island) and Guemes Island. The ferry carries commuters, visitors, construction and logging trucks, essential-services trucks, and emergency vehicles and personnel to and from the island.

In addition to its regularly scheduled runs, the ferry stands ready 24/7 to transport emergency responders to and from the island in response to 911 calls.

The ferry is briefly taken out of service once every two years for overhaul and maintenance in a shipyard. During that time, passenger-only service is provided by the Strait Arrow, under contract with Skagit County Public Works' Ferry Division. When serving the Anacortes-Guemes ferry route, the Strait Arrow is manned by a captain provided by the vessel's owner, Arrow Launch Service; and two crew members from the M/V Guemes. Residents needing to get a vehicle to or from the island can contract with M/V San Juan Enterprise, which is owned by San Juan Marine Freight.

A renovation of the terminals at Anacortes and Guemes was completed in May 2011.  Also in May 2011, the Washington State Department of Transportation completed a new terminal building at Anacortes, with funding through the American Recovery and Reinvestment Act.

The first floor of the Anacortes terminal building houses a ferry passenger waiting area, restrooms, purser's office, and maintenance workshop. The second floor houses offices, restroom, crew room and kitchen. There is also a parking lot and outdoor waiting area.

On Guemes Island, there is a waiting room, parking lot and portable restroom.

Ferry and crew
The current ferry, M/V Guemes, (91 tons) is a 21-vehicle, 100-passenger, diesel-powered ferry designed by Nickum & Spaulding of Seattle and built by Gladding-Hearn Shipbuilding in Somerset, Massachusetts. She was launched on Dec. 21, 1978 and put into service on the Anacortes-Guemes route in 1979.

The ferry operates daily and transports roughly 200,000 vehicles and 400,000 passengers annually. Its certificate of inspection sets the capacity at 100 passengers and three crew members.

Crew members regularly conduct drills in abandoning ship, overboard rescue, and shipboard firefighting. The crew also undergoes regular training in first aid, CPR, and hazardous materials spill prevention and response.

In 2021, there were 19 crew on the roster (four full-time, six part-time, and nine on-call). Ten had 100-ton master's licenses and seven were certified to serve as captain of the ferry.

The Guemes was presented a plaque by the crew of the NanSea in appreciation for assistance rendered when the 28-foot motor yacht developed engine trouble and went adrift the evening of July 28, 1995 in Guemes Channel.

The Guemes was presented a certificate of commendation by the Skagit County Board of County Commissioners for the crew's rescue of a kayaker between Guemes and Cypress islands on Feb. 21, 1999.

Notes

References
 Guemes Island Historical Society (accessed 05-23-11)
 Guemes Island Ferry official site. (accessed 05-23-11)
 Kline, Mary S., and Bayless, G.A., Ferryboats -- A Legend on Puget Sound, Bayless Books, Seattle, WA 1983 
 Newell, Gordon R. ed., H.W. McCurdy Marine History of the Pacific Northwest,  Superior Publishing, Seattle WA 1966 
 Washington State Dept of Transportation, Washington Jobs Now, “Guemes Ferry Terminal Building”. (accessed 05-23-11).

External links
 Excerpts from 1975 environmental impact statement.  Describes 1975 status of ferry and docks in detail.
 Skagit County (official) website

Ferry routes in western Washington (state)
Transportation in Skagit County, Washington
History of Skagit County, Washington
Anacortes, Washington